The 2018–19 Essex Senior Football League season was the 48th in the history of Essex Senior Football League, a football competition in England.

The provisional club allocations for steps 5 and 6 were announced by the FA on 25 May 2018. The constitution was ratified by the league at its AGM.

League table

The league featured 16 clubs which competed in the division last season, along with four new clubs.
Clubs transferred from the Spartan South Midlands League:
Hoddesdon Town
St Margaretsbury
Clubs transferred from the Eastern Counties League:
Saffron Walden Town
Stanway Rovers

Also, Wadham Lodge changed name to Leyton Athletic, while Waltham Forest changed name to Walthamstow.

League table

References

Essex Senior Football League seasons
9